Middle Creek is a  tributary of Toms Creek in Pennsylvania and Maryland in the United States.

Middle Creek is born on the eastern slope of the Blue Ridge Mountains, and from there flows through Adams County, Pennsylvania and Frederick County, Maryland to join Toms Creek near Emmitsburg.

Water from Middle Creek flows via Toms Creek, the Monocacy River, and the Potomac River to Chesapeake Bay and eventually the Atlantic Ocean.

See also
List of rivers of Maryland
List of rivers of Pennsylvania

References

Tributaries of the Monocacy River
Rivers of Frederick County, Maryland
Rivers of Adams County, Pennsylvania
Rivers of Maryland
Rivers of Pennsylvania